The 1946 Combined Scottish Universities by-election was a by-election held from 22 to 27 November 1946 for the Combined Scottish Universities, a university constituency of the British House of Commons.

It was the last election for a university constituency of the UK Parliament; the Combined Scottish Universities was abolished along with the other university seats for the 1950 general election.

Vacancy 
The seat had become vacant on 16 October 1946 when the independent Member of Parliament (MP) Sir John Boyd Orr had resigned by the procedural device of accepting the post of Steward and Bailiff of the Chiltern Hundreds, a notional 'office of profit under the crown' which is used as a procedural device to enable MPs to resign from the Commons. After his resignation, Boyd took up the position of Director-General of the United Nations Food and Agriculture Organization. He had held the seat he was first elected at a by-election in 1945.

Candidates 
Five candidates contested the by-election, none of whom had stood in 1945.

The Unionist candidate was Walter Elliot, who had been MP for Glasgow Kelvingrove for more than 20 years, until his narrow defeat at the 1945 general election.  He had been Secretary of State for Scotland from 1936 to 1938.

The Labour Party candidate was the philosopher and broadcaster C. E. M. Joad.  The Liberal Party fielded J. M. Bannerman, who had contested Argyll in 1945, and the National Liberals nominated Dr R. S. Stevenson, who had stood in West Fife in 1945.

The fifth candidate was J. G. Jameson, a member of the Federal Union who stood as an advocate of the policies of the Federal Union, although the union did not endorse his candidacy.

Result 
The result was a clear victory for the Unionist candidate, Walter Elliot, who won over 68% of the votes, and a majority of more than 50% over the second-placed Labour candidate.  Elliot held the seat until the university constituencies were abolished for the 1950 general election.

Votes

See also 
Combined Scottish Universities (UK Parliament constituency)
1927 Combined Scottish Universities by-election
1934 Combined Scottish Universities by-election
1935 Combined Scottish Universities by-election
1936 Combined Scottish Universities by-election
1938 Combined Scottish Universities by-election
1945 Combined Scottish Universities by-election
List of United Kingdom by-elections (1931–1950)

References

Sources 

 Tony Judge, Radio Philosopher - The Radical Life of Cyril Joad (Charleston SC Alphahouse Books 2012)) 

1946 in Scotland
1940s elections in Scotland
1946 elections in the United Kingdom
By-elections to the Parliament of the United Kingdom in the Combined Scottish Universities
Higher education in Scotland